The Undefeated is an American 1969 Western novelization by Jim Thompson based on the film The Undefeated starring John Wayne.

Plot
After the Civil War, ex-Confederate soldiers heading to Mexico run into ex-Union soldiers selling horses to the Mexican government and join forces to fight off Mexican revolutionaries.

References

External links

Novels by Jim Thompson
1969 American novels
English-language novels
Western (genre) novels
Novels based on films